The 2013–14 Football League Cup (known as the Capital One Cup for sponsorship reasons) was the 54th season of the Football League Cup, a knock-out competition for the top 92 football clubs played in English football league system. Swansea City were the defending champions, but were eliminated by Birmingham City in the 3rd round.

Numbers within brackets represented a team's league level in the 2013–14 season, level 1 being the Premier League, level 2 the Championship, and so on.

On 16 December 2013, it was announced that goal-line technology would be used in three of the four quarter-finals and any subsequent matches in the Capital One Cup. The system was used the very next day, in the Sunderland – Chelsea quarter-final, in which an own-goal from Lee Cattermole was allowed.

The cup was won by Manchester City who defeated Sunderland 3–1 in the final. This was their first League Cup trophy since 1976 and their third win overall.

First round
The draw for the first round took place on 17 June 2013 at 09:30 BST. Ties were played during the week commencing 5 August 2013.

Northern section

Southern section

Second round
The draw for the second round took place on 8 August 2013 at 12:30 BST. All the Premier League clubs that were not partaking in European competition (UEFA Champions League or Europa League) entered in this round along with Reading who were one of the two best relegated teams from the prior season. Wigan Athletic, who were the other of the two best relegated teams did not enter in this round, due to winning the FA Cup and thus a place in the UEFA Europa League. They entered in the third round. All ties were played during the week commencing 26 August 2013.

Third round
The draw for the third round took place live on Sky Sports on 28 August 2013. All the clubs partaking in European competition (holders Swansea City, Manchester United, Manchester City, Chelsea, Arsenal, Tottenham Hotspur and Wigan Athletic) entered here, as well as the winning teams from the second round. Only Crystal Palace from the Premier League failed to make it to the third round, and only Bristol City, Swindon Town, Peterborough United and Tranmere Rovers remained from League One.

Fourth round
The draw for the fourth round took place on 25 September 2013 live on Sky Sports.
All ties were originally to be played during the week commencing 28 October 2013, but the game between Sunderland and Southampton was later moved to 6 November 2013. Birmingham City, Burnley and Leicester City were the only teams outside of the Premier League left in the competition, all three compete in the Championship.

Fifth round
The draw for the fifth round took place on 30 October 2013. All ties were played during the week commencing 16 December 2013. Leicester City, who compete in the Championship, were the only team outside of the Premier League left in the competition.

Semi-finals
The draw for the semi-finals took place on 18 December 2013 after the televised game between Stoke City and Manchester United.

First leg

Second leg

Final

Top scorers

Broadcasting rights
The domestic broadcasting rights for the competition were held by the subscription channel Sky Sports, who have held rights to the competition since 1996–97. During this season Sky had exclusive live broadcasting rights.

These matches were broadcast live by Sky Sports on television:

References

EFL Cup seasons
Football League Cup
Football League Cup
Cup